Wahnena is an unorganized territory in Cass County, Minnesota, United States. The population was 197 at the 2000 census. It is part of the Brainerd Micropolitan Statistical Area. Wahnena was named for an Ojibwe chief.

Geography
According to the United States Census Bureau, the unorganized territory has a total area of 34.8 square miles (90.3 km2), of which 34.0 square miles (88.2 km2) is land and 0.8 square mile (2.1 km2) (2.30%) is water.

Demographics
As of the census of 2000, there were 197 people, 67 households, and 50 families residing in the unorganized territory.  The population density was 5.8 people per square mile (2.2/km2).  There were 86 housing units at an average density of 2.5/sq mi (1.0/km2).  The racial makeup of the unorganized territory was 94.92% White, 3.05% Native American, and 2.03% from two or more races.

There were 67 households, out of which 43.3% had children under the age of 18 living with them, 65.7% were married couples living together, 10.4% had a female householder with no husband present, and 23.9% were non-families. 22.4% of all households were made up of individuals, and 7.5% had someone living alone who was 65 years of age or older.  The average household size was 2.94 and the average family size was 3.45.

In the unorganized territory the population was spread out, with 36.5% under the age of 18, 4.6% from 18 to 24, 24.9% from 25 to 44, 23.9% from 45 to 64, and 10.2% who were 65 years of age or older.  The median age was 35 years. For every 100 females, there were 118.9 males.  For every 100 females age 18 and over, there were 108.3 males.

The median income for a household in the unorganized territory was $26,607, and the median income for a family was $30,833. Males had a median income of $25,000 versus $21,875 for females. The per capita income for the unorganized territory was $9,026.  About 22.9% of families and 37.2% of the population were below the poverty line, including 64.2% of those under the age of eighteen and none of those 65 or over.

References

Populated places in Cass County, Minnesota
Unorganized territories in Minnesota
Brainerd, Minnesota micropolitan area